Causeway Link (service brands) operated by Handal Indah Sdn Bhd is a public bus operator in Johor Bahru, Malaysia. It operates cross-border services into Singapore via the Johor–Singapore Causeway and Malaysia–Singapore Second Link. They also provide bus service in Johor, Klang, Puchong, Batu Pahat and Singapore.

Starting from 29 November 2021, Causeway Link started a Vaccinated Travel Lane(VTL) land service between Johor Bahru, Larkin Sentral and Singapore, Queen Street Terminal. This services was renamed to Vaccinated Travel Bus Service (VTBS) on 1 April 2022 in line with the reopening of the Singapore-Malaysia Land Border for vaccinated travellers. The bus service ceased operations on 1 May 2022 when regular cross-border bus services resumed on that same date.

History
The company was established in 2003.

References

External links

External links

2003 establishments in Malaysia
Bus companies of Malaysia
Privately held companies of Malaysia
Transport companies established in 2003
Transport in Johor
Transport in the Klang Valley